The Horseshoe Hills are a roughly crescent-shaped range of hills north of Manhattan, Montana in Gallatin County, Montana. The hills are bounded on the north by Sixteen Mile Creek (which begins in the Crazy Mountains), the first major tributary of the Missouri River. As they are in the rain shadow of the Boulder, Elkhorn, and Bull Mountains to the west, the Horseshoe Hills are notably dry, receiving  of precipitation annually. This is especially true on the southern and southeastern flanks, which are also in the rain shadow of the hills themselves. In the driest areas, Missouri foxtail cacti, plains prickly pear cacti, and yucca abound, as well as prairie rattlesnakes. Much of the hills are private property, but there is also some state, BLM, and National Forest land.

See also
 List of mountain ranges in Montana

Notes

Mountain ranges of Montana
Landforms of Gallatin County, Montana